"Greedy Fly" is a song by alternative rock band Bush, released on 28 January 1997 as the second single from their second studio album, Razorblade Suitcase (1996).

Music video
Bush were one of the early pioneers of the enhanced CD single, with the full video being available as a file on CD 2. The video was directed by Marcus Nispel in December 1996 in Los Angeles. The video was shot in the same building Se7en was shot in and cost nearly half a million pounds.

Commercial performance
"Greedy Fly" was released as the second single from the album, after "Swallowed". The song became a hit, possibly due to its well-known music video, which clocks in at over 7 minutes (although the song itself is only 4:29 long). The song reached the top 5 on both the US Alternative Songs chart and Mainstream Rock Tracks. The song is also the band's second biggest hit in their native Britain where it peaked at #22  (behind "Swallowed" which peaked at #7).

Track listing
All songs written by Gavin Rossdale unless stated.

UK CD 1 Single IND95536 (Cardsleeve)
 "Greedy Fly [Radio Edit]" - 3:50
 "Old" - 2:51
 "Insect Kin [Live at the London Forum]" - 4:57
 "Personal Holloway [Live]" - 3:28
UK CD 2 Single INDX95536
 "Greedy Fly [Video]" - 7:09
 "Greedy Fly [LP Version]" - 4:27
 "Greedy Fly [Demo]" - 4:25
AUS CD Single IND95536 (Slidecase)
 "Greedy Fly" - 4:28
 "Swallowed [Toasted Both Sides Please - Goldie Remix]" - 5:49
 "Cold Contagious [16"oz Demo Version]" - 5:57
 "Greedy Fly [Video]" - 7:09

Appearances in the media
- Featured on Cold Case in the episode "Spiders".

Chart performance

References

External links

1996 songs
1997 singles
Bush (British band) songs
Song recordings produced by Steve Albini
Songs written by Gavin Rossdale
Grunge songs
Music videos directed by Marcus Nispel
Interscope Records singles
Trauma Records singles